Hot Issue is the second Korean-language extended play (EP) by South Korean boy band Big Bang. It was released under YG Entertainment on November 22, 2007, and spawned the single "Last Farewell".

Composition 
The group's leader, the then 20-year-old G-Dragon produced and wrote the lyrics for all tracks on Hot Issue. "Last Farewell" is a blend of trance hip-hop beats and pop melodies. The song also features rapping by G-Dragon and T.O.P and melodic vocals from Taeyang, Daesung, and Seungri. "Crazy Dog" features synthesizers and a sampling from the Seo Taiji and Boys song "In My Fantasy."

Reception 
Hot Issue marked BigBang's first EP after Always and further established the group's popularity in South Korea, with the single "Last Farewell" topping online charts for 8 consecutive weeks. Due to the song's digital success, it won the Song of the Month award at Cyworld Digital Music Awards. The extended play sold over a 120,000 copies in South Korea.

Track listing 

Sample credits
 "But I Love U" contains a sample of "Rhu of Redd Holt Unlimited" by Paula
 "Crazy Dog" contains a sample of "You, In the Fantasy" (Hangul: 환상 속의 그대; rr: Huansang Sogae Goodae) by Seo Taiji & Boys

Charts

Weekly charts

Monthly charts

References

External links 
 Big Bang Official Site

BigBang (South Korean band) EPs
2007 EPs
YG Entertainment EPs
Korean-language EPs
Albums produced by G-Dragon